David Wooster King was a student at Harvard University from 1912–1914, and subsequently enlisted in the French Foreign Legion in August 1917.  He later transferred to the French Army in 1915, then in November 1917 was commissioned as a 1st lieutenant in the United States Army.

He was also an author, and wrote a book about his experiences in the Legion and the French Army, L.M.8046:  An Intimate Story of the French Foreign Legion, alternate title: Ten Thousand Shall Fall, (NY: Duffield & Company, 1927).

Notes

External links
Link to books authored.
Short biography.

Harvard University alumni
United States Army personnel of World War I
Soldiers of the French Foreign Legion
United States Army officers
French Army personnel
Year of birth missing
Year of death missing